Noelia Sala (born 4 March 1988)  is an Argentinian handball player. She defends club Dorrego and Argentina, and has played at the 2013 World Women's Handball Championship in Serbia. She is a member of the Fembal, Super 4 Women, League of Honor Ladies leagues.

References

Argentine female handball players
1988 births
Living people
Pan American Games medalists in handball
Pan American Games silver medalists for Argentina
Handball players at the 2011 Pan American Games
Medalists at the 2011 Pan American Games
21st-century Argentine women